È arrivato mio fratello ("Here's My Brother") is a 1985 Italian comedy film directed by Franco Castellano and Giuseppe Moccia.

Plot
The boring and mundane Professor Ovidio has a twin brother called Raf who, on the contrary is an exuberant, womanizing night club pianist. His arrival will bring trouble to Ovidio but in the end his drab life will take a turn for the best.

Cast
 Renato Pozzetto Ovidio Ceciotti/Raffaele Ceciotti
 Carin McDonald as Esmeralda
 Armando Bandini as the principal
 Beatrice Palme as Lidia Cairoli
 Pamela Prati as Mrs. Piranesi
 Richard Harrison as Spinetti
 Enzo Andronico as notary
 Roberto Ceccacci
 Pietro Ghislandi as stand-in of Raf & Ovidio

See also   
 List of Italian films of 1985

References

External links

1985 films
1985 comedy films
Italian comedy films
1980s Italian-language films
Films set in Milan
Films directed by Castellano & Pipolo
Films scored by Detto Mariano
Films about twin brothers
1980s Italian films